A junction is where two or more roads meet.

History 
Roads began as a means of linking locations of interest: towns, forts and geographic features such as river fords. Where roads met outside of an existing settlement, these junctions often led to a new settlement. Scotch Corner is an example of such a location.

In the United Kingdom and other countries, the practice of giving names to junctions emerged, to help travellers find their way. Junctions took the name of a prominent nearby business or a point of interest.

As of the road networks increased in density and traffic flows followed suit, managing the flow of traffic across the junction became of increasing importance, to minimize delays and improve safety. The first innovation was to add traffic control devices, such as stop signs and traffic lights that regulated traffic flow. Next came lane controls that limited what each lane of traffic was allowed to do while crossing. Turns across oncoming traffic might be prohibited, or allowed only when oncoming and crossing traffic was stopped.

This was followed by specialized junction designs that incorporated information about traffic volumes, speeds, driver intent and many other factors.

Types 
The most basic distinction among junction types is whether or not the roads cross at the same or different elevations. More expensive, grade-separated interchanges generally offer higher throughput at higher cost. Single-grade intersections are lower cost and lower throughput. Each main type comes in many variants.

Interchange 

At interchanges, roads pass above or below each other, using grade separation and slip roads. The terms motorway junction and highway interchange typically refer to this layout. They can be further subdivided into those with and without signal controls.

Signalized (traffic-light controlled) interchanges include such "diamond" designs as the diverging diamond, Michigan urban diamond, three-level diamond, and tight diamond. Others include center-turn overpass, contraflow left, single loop, and single-point urban overpass.

Non-signalized designs include the cloverleaf, contraflow left, dogbone (restricted dumbbell), double crossover merging, dumbbell (grade-separated bowtie), echelon, free-flow interchange, partial cloverleaf, raindrop, single and double roundabouts (grade-separated roundabout), single-point urban, stack, and windmill.

 (literally "autobahn cross"), short form , and abbreviated as AK, is a four-way interchange on the German autobahn network.  (literally "autobahn triangle"), short form , and abbreviated as AD, is a three-way interchange on the German autobahn network.

Intersection 

At intersections, roads cross at-grade. They also can be further subdivided into those with and without signal controls.

Signalized designs include advanced stop line, bowtie, box junction, continuous-flow intersection, continuous Green-T, double-wide, hook turn, jughandle, median u-turn, Michigan left, paired, quadrant, seagulls, slip lane, split, staggered, superstreet, Texas T, Texas U-turn and turnarounds.

Non-signalized designs include unsignalized variations on continuous-flow 3 and 4-leg, median u-turn and superstreet, along with Maryland T/J, roundabout and traffic circle.

Safety

In the EU it is estimated that around 5,000 out of 26,100 people who are killed in car crashes are killed in a junction collision, in 2015, while it was around 8,000 in 2006. During the 2006–2015 decade, this means around 20% of road fatalities occur at junctions.

By kind of users junctions fatalities are car users, 34%; pedestrians, 23%; motorcycle, 21%; pedal-cycle 12%; and other road users, the remaining.

Causes of fatalities

It has been considered that several causes might lead to fatalities; for instance:
 Observation missed – the largest category, encompassing all factors that cause a driver or rider to not notice something:
 Physical factors:
 Temporary obstruction to view
 Permanent obstruction to view
 Permanent sight obstruction
 Human factors:
 Faulty diagnosis – a misunderstanding of another road user's actions or the road conditions
 Distraction
 Inadequate plan – the details of the situation, as interpreted by the road user, are lacking in quantity and/or quality (including their correspondence to reality)
 Inattention
 Faulty diagnosis (not leading to observation missed)
 Information failure – the road user judged the situation incorrectly and made a decision based upon the incorrect judgement (e.g. thinking that another vehicle is moving when it is not, and thus colliding with it)
 Communication failure – a miscommunication between road users
 Inadequate plan (not leading to observation missed)
 Insufficient knowledge

Protected intersections

Bicycles 

A number of features make this protected intersection much safer. A corner refuge island, a setback crossing of the pedestrians and cyclists, generally between 1.5–7 metres of setback, a forward stop bar, which allows cyclists to stop for a traffic light well ahead of motor traffic who must stop behind the crosswalk. Separate signal staging or at least an advance green for cyclists and pedestrians is used to give cyclists and pedestrians no conflicts or a head start over traffic. The design makes a right turn on red, and sometimes left on red depending on the geometry of the intersection in question, possible in many cases, often without stopping.

Cyclists ideally have a protected bike lane on the approach to the intersection, separated by a concrete median with splay kerbs if possible, and have a protected bike lane width of at least 2 metres if possible (one way). In the Netherlands, most one way cycle paths are at least 2.5 metres wide.

Bicycle traffic can be accommodated with the low grade bike lanes in the roadway or higher grade and much safer protected bicycle paths that are physically separated from the roadway.

In Manchester, UK, traffic engineers have designed a protected junction known as the Cycle-Optimised Signal (CYCLOPS) Junction. This design places a circulatory cycle track around the edge of the junction, with pedestrian crossing on the inside. This design allows for an all-red pedestrian / cyclist phase with reduced conflicts. Traffic signals are timed to allow cyclists to make a right turn (across oncoming traffic) in one turn). It also allows for diagonal crossings (pedestrian scramble) and reduces crossing distances for pedestrians.

Pedestrians 
Intersections generally must manage pedestrian as well as vehicle traffic. Pedestrian aids include crosswalks, pedestrian-directed traffic signals ("walk light") and over/underpasses. Walk lights may be accompanied by audio signals to aid the visually impaired. Medians can offer pedestrian islands, allowing pedestrians to divide their crossings into a separate segment for each traffic direction, possibly with a separate signal for each.

See also 
 List of road junctions in the United Kingdom
 Junction (traffic)

References 

 
 
Transport infrastructure